Peter Creek is a stream in Bates County in the U.S. state of Missouri. It is a tributary of the South Grand River.

The stream headwaters arise northwest of Ballard and the stream flows northeast passing east of Aaron to its confluence with a meander of the old South Grand channel at the northern boundary of Bates County.

Peter Creek bears the name of Peter Ewing, a pioneer citizen.

See also
List of rivers of Missouri

References

Rivers of Bates County, Missouri
Rivers of Missouri